Eucosma symploca is a species of moth of the family Tortricidae. It is found in Australia, where it has been recorded from Queensland.

The wingspan is about 9 mm. The forewings are dark brownish fuscous with a large whitish suffused blotch and three short oblique whitish costal strigulae (fine streaks), as well as some transverse whitish strigulae in the dorsal area. The hindwings are pale grey.

References

Moths described in 1946
Eucosmini